Stenella araguata is a species of anamorphic fungi.

References

External links

araguata